Chatchai Paholpat (Thai ชัชชัย พหลแพทย์) is a former Thailand national football team player and head coach of Thailand national team in 2004. Currently, He has been the head coach in Thailand Premier League side Customs Department FC. He has led the side to the Thailand Division 1 League title in 2008.

He made several appearances for the Thailand national football team, including four 1974 FIFA World Cup qualifying matches. He also played for Thailand at the 1968 Summer Olympics in Mexico.

Chatchai was also head coach of the national team in 2004 and led the side in 2004 Asian Cup in China.

Sides Managed

Bangkok Bank FC: 1990-1992
Thailand national football team: 2004
Osotsapa FC:1996-2006 
Hoang Anh Gia Lai:2007
Customs Department FC: 2008
Hoang Anh Gia Lai:2009
Pattaya United:2013

Honours

Thailand Premier League: Runner-up (2006) Third Place (2004, 2005)
Queen's Cup: Champions (2004)

References

External links

1952 births
Living people
Expatriate footballers in Vietnam
Footballers at the 1968 Summer Olympics
Chatchai Paholpat
Chatchai Paholpat
Chatchai Paholpat
Chatchai Paholpat
Chatchai Paholpat
Chatchai Paholpat
Thailand national football team managers
2004 AFC Asian Cup managers
Chatchai Paholpat
Footballers at the 1970 Asian Games
1972 AFC Asian Cup players
Southeast Asian Games medalists in football
Chatchai Paholpat
Association football midfielders
Competitors at the 1967 Southeast Asian Peninsular Games
Chatchai Paholpat